American country music singer Patty Loveless has received five Country Music Association awards, two Academy of Country Music awards, one American Music Award and two Grammy Awards.

Her first award nomination was in 1985, when the Academy of Country Music nominated her as Top New Female Vocalist. Three years later, the Country Music Association nominated her for the Horizon Award (now the Best New Artist award). In 1998, she was one of several featured vocalists on the collaborative track "Same Old Train" from the album A Tribute to Tradition, which won the Grammy Award for Best Country Collaboration with Vocals. In 2011, she received a second Grammy, this time for Best Bluegrass Album for Mountain Soul II.

American Music Awards

!
|-
| 1989
| rowspan="2"| Patty Loveless
| Favorite New Country Artist
| 
| align="center"| 
|-
| 1991
| Favorite Country Female Artist
| 
| align="center"| 
|-
|}

Academy of Country Music Awards

!
|-
| 1985
| Patty Loveless
| Top New Female Vocalist
| 
| align="center" rowspan="19"| 
|-
| 1989
| "Timber, I'm Falling in Love"
| Single Record of the Year
| 
|-
|1990
| Patty Loveless
| Top Female Vocalist
|
|-
| 1992
| "Send a Message to My Heart" 
| Top Vocal Duet
| 
|-
| rowspan=3|1994
| rowspan=2|"How Can I Help You Say Goodbye"
| Video of the Year
| 
|-
| Song of the Year
| 
|-
| rowspan="2"| Patty Loveless
| rowspan="2"| Top Female Vocalist
| 
|-
| rowspan=3|1995
| 
|-
| "You Don't Even Know Who I Am"
| Song of the Year
| 
|-
| When Fallen Angels Fly
| Album of the Year
|
|-
| rowspan=2|1996
| Patty Loveless
| Top Female Vocalist
| 
|-
| The Trouble with the Truth
| Album of the Year
| 
|-
| rowspan=3|1997
| "You Don't Seem to Miss Me" 
| Vocal Event of the Year
|
|-
| Patty Loveless
| Top Female Vocalist
| 
|-
| Long Stretch of Lonesome
| Album of the Year
| 
|-
| 1998
| "Same Old Train" 
| rowspan="2"| Vocal Event of the Year
| 
|-
| 1999
| "My Kind of Woman/My Kind of Man" 
|
|-
| 2001
| "Out of Control Raging Fire" 
| Vocal Event of the Year
| 
|-
| 2003
| Patty Loveless
| Top Female Vocalist of the Year
| 
|}

Country Music Association Awards

!
|-
| 1988
| rowspan="4"| Patty Loveless
| Horizon Award
| 
| align="center" rowspan="19"| 
|-
| rowspan=2|1989
| Horizon Award
| 
|-
| Female Vocalist of the Year
| 
|-
| 1991
| Female Vocalist of the Year
| 
|-
| 1993
| "I Don't Need Your Rockin' Chair" 
| Vocal Event of the Year
| 
|-
| rowspan=2|1994
| rowspan=2|"How Can I Help You Say Goodbye"
| Music Video of the Year
| 
|-
| Single of the Year
| 
|-
| rowspan=2|1995
| When Fallen Angels Fly
| Album of the Year
|
|-
| Patty Loveless
| Female Vocalist of the Year
| 
|-
| rowspan="2"| 1996
| The Trouble with the Truth
| Album of the Year
| 
|-
| rowspan="2"| Patty Loveless
| Female Vocalist of the Year
| 
|-
| 1997
| Female Vocalist of the Year
| 
|-
| rowspan=4|1998
| Long Stretch of Lonesome
| Album of the Year
| 
|-
| Patty Loveless
| Female Vocalist of the Year
| 
|-
| rowspan=2|"You Don't Seem to Miss Me"
| Single of the Year
| 
|-
| Vocal Event of the Year
| 
|-
| rowspan="2"| 1999
| "My Kind of Woman/My Kind of Man" 
| rowspan=2| Vocal Event of the Year
| 
|-
| "Same Old Train" 
| 
|-
| 2003
| Patty Loveless
| Female Vocalist of the Year
| 
|-
|}

Grammy Awards

!
|-
| 1995
| "How Can I Help You Say Goodbye"
| Best Female Country Vocal Performance
| 
| align="center" rowspan="13"| 
|-
| 1996
| "You Don't Even Know Who I Am"
| Best Female Country Vocal Performance
| 
|-
| 1997
| The Trouble with the Truth
| Best Country Album
| 
|-
| rowspan=3| 1998
| "The Trouble with the Truth"
| Best Female Country Vocal Performance
| 
|-
| "You Don't Seem to Miss Me" 
| Best Country Collaboration with Vocals
| 
|-
| Long Stretch of Lonesome
| Best Country Album
| 
|-
| rowspan=2|1999
| "Same Old Train" 
| rowspan=2|Best Country Collaboration with Vocals
| 
|-
| "My Kind of Woman/My Kind of Man" 
| 
|-
| 2002
| Mountain Soul
| Best Bluegrass Album
| 
|-
| 2004
| "On Your Way Home"
| Best Female Country Vocal Performance
| 
|-
| rowspan=2|2009
| "House of Cash" 
| Best Country Collaboration with Vocals
| 
|-
| Sleepless Nights
| Best Country Album
| 
|-
| 2011
| Best Bluegrass Album
| Mountain Soul II
| 
|-
|}

References

Loveless, Patty